Rudolf F. Haffenreffer III (c. 1902 – April 28, 1991) was a Rhode Island industrialist and philanthropist.  Among his numerous family enterprises he was best known for his role as president and chairman of the Narragansett Brewing Company.  He also gained ownership of the Mount Hope Bridge through receivership in 1931. In 1955, Haffenreffer donated  of wooded shorefront property in Bristol, Rhode Island to Brown University to create what became the Haffenreffer Museum of Anthropology.

See also 
 Haffenreffer Brewery
 Private Stock (malt liquor)

Notes

Further reading 
  Obituary.

1900s births
1991 deaths
Businesspeople from Rhode Island
20th-century American philanthropists
20th-century American businesspeople